Rabbi Lior Edri (born 13 February 1979) is an Israeli rabbi and politician. He briefly served as a member of the Knesset for Shas in 2015.

Biography
Edri studied in two yeshivas and a kolel in Netanya. He went on to become a manager at Badatz Beit Yosef, supervising meat kashrut.

A member of Shas, he was placed thirteenth on the party's list for the 2013 Knesset elections. Although Shas won only 11 seats, Edri entered the Knesset on 1 January 2015 following the resignation of Aryeh Deri. He was not on the party's list for the March 2015 elections, losing his seat.

References

External links

1979 births
People from Netanya
Shas politicians
Members of the 19th Knesset (2013–2015)
Living people
Badatz Beit Yosef